Pey Rud (also Romanized as Pey Rūd, Pai-Rūd, Pa yi Rūd, and Pay-ye Rūd; also known as Zenūr) is a village in Jolgeh-e Mazhan Rural District, Jolgeh-e Mazhan District, Khusf County, South Khorasan Province, Iran. At the 2006 census, its population was 105, in 33 families.

References 

Populated places in Khusf County